A random variable (also called random quantity, aleatory variable, or stochastic variable) is a mathematical formalization of a quantity or object which depends on random events.

Informally, randomness typically represents some fundamental element of chance, such as in the roll of a die; it may also represent uncertainty, such as measurement error. However, the interpretation of probability is philosophically complicated, and even in specific cases is not always straightforward. The purely mathematical analysis of random variables is independent of such interpretational difficulties, and can be based upon a rigorous axiomatic setup.

In the formal mathematical language of measure theory, a random variable is defined as a measurable function from a probability measure space (called the sample space) to a measurable space. This allows consideration of the pushforward measure, which is called the distribution of the random variable; the distribution is thus a probability measure on the set of all possible values of the random variable. It is possible for two random variables to have identical distributions but to differ in significant ways; for instance, they may be independent.

It is common to consider the special cases of discrete random variables and absolutely continuous random variables, corresponding to whether a random variable is valued in a discrete set (such as a finite set) or in an interval of real numbers. There are other important possibilities, especially in the theory of stochastic processes, wherein it is natural to consider random sequences or random functions. Sometimes a random variable is taken to be automatically valued in the real numbers, with more general random quantities instead being called random elements.

According to George Mackey, Pafnuty Chebyshev was the first person "to think systematically in terms of random variables".

Definition

A random variable  is a measurable function  from a sample space  as a set of possible outcomes to a measurable space . The technical axiomatic definition requires the sample space  to be a sample space of a probability triple  (see the measure-theoretic definition).

The probability that  takes on a value in a measurable set  is written as

Standard case

In many cases,  is real-valued, i.e. . In some contexts, the term random element (see extensions) is used to denote a random variable not of this form.

If the image is uncountably infinite (usually an interval) then  is called a continuous random variable. In the special case that it is absolutely continuous, its distribution can be described by a probability density function, which assigns probabilities to intervals; in particular, each individual point must necessarily have probability zero for an absolutely continuous random variable. Not all continuous random variables are absolutely continuous, a mixture distribution is one such counterexample; such random variables cannot be described by a probability density or a probability mass function.

Any random variable can be described by its cumulative distribution function, which describes the probability that the random variable will be less than or equal to a certain value.

Extensions

The term "random variable" in statistics is traditionally limited to the real-valued case. In this case, the structure of the real numbers makes it possible to define quantities such as the expected value and variance of a random variable, its cumulative distribution function, and the moments of its distribution.

However, the definition above is valid for any measurable space  of values. Thus one can consider random elements of other sets , such as random boolean values, categorical values, complex numbers, vectors, matrices, sequences, trees, sets, shapes, manifolds, and functions. One may then specifically refer to a random variable of type , or an -valued random variable.

This more general concept of a random element is particularly useful in disciplines such as graph theory, machine learning, natural language processing, and other fields in discrete mathematics and computer science, where one is often interested in modeling the random variation of non-numerical data structures. In this case, a random element may optionally be represented as a vector of real-valued random variables (all defined on the same underlying probability space , which allows the different random variables to covary). For example:
A random word may be represented as a random integer that serves as an index into the vocabulary of possible words.
A random sentence of given length  may be represented as a vector of  random words.
A random graph on  given vertices may be represented as a  matrix of random variables, whose values specify the adjacency matrix of the random graph.
A random function  may be represented as a collection of random variables , giving the function's values at the various points  in the function's domain. The  are ordinary real-valued random variables provided that the function is real-valued.

Distribution functions

Such a probability distribution, if  is real-valued, can always be captured by its cumulative distribution function

and sometimes also using a probability density function, . The measure  is called the "(probability) distribution of " or the "law of ".
The underlying probability space  is a technical device used to guarantee the existence of random variables, sometimes to construct them, and to define notions such as correlation and dependence or independence based on a joint distribution of two or more random variables on the same probability space. In practice, one often disposes of the space  altogether and just puts a measure on  that assigns measure 1 to the whole real line, i.e., one works with probability distributions instead of random variables.  See the article on quantile functions for fuller development.

Examples

Discrete random variable

In an experiment a person may be chosen at random, and one random variable may be the person's height.  Mathematically, the random variable is interpreted as a function which maps the person to the person's height.  Associated with the random variable is a probability distribution that allows the computation of the probability that the height is in any subset of possible values, such as the probability that the height is between 180 and 190 cm, or the probability that the height is either less than 150 or more than 200 cm.

Another random variable may be the person's number of children; this is a discrete random variable with  non-negative integer values.  It allows the computation of probabilities for individual integer values – the probability mass function (PMF) – or for sets of values, including infinite sets.  For example, the event of interest may be "an even number of children".  For both finite and infinite event sets, their probabilities can be found by adding up the PMFs of the elements; that is, the probability of an even number of children is the infinite sum .

In examples such as these, the sample space is often suppressed, since it is mathematically hard to describe, and the possible values of the random variables are then treated as a sample space.  But when two random variables are measured on the same sample space of outcomes, such as the height and number of children being computed on the same random persons, it is easier to track their relationship if it is acknowledged that both height and number of children come from the same random person, for example so that questions of whether such random variables are correlated or not can be posed.

Coin toss

The possible outcomes for one coin toss can be described by the sample space . We can introduce a real-valued random variable  that models a $1 payoff for a successful bet on heads as follows:

If the coin is a fair coin, Y has a probability mass function  given by:

Dice roll

A random variable can also be used to describe the process of rolling dice and the possible outcomes. The most obvious representation for the two-dice case is to take the set of pairs of numbers n1 and n2 from {1, 2, 3, 4, 5, 6} (representing the numbers on the two dice) as the sample space. The total number rolled (the sum of the numbers in each pair) is then a random variable X given by the function that maps the pair to the sum:

and (if the dice are fair) has a probability mass function fX given by:

Continuous random variable

Formally, a continuous random variable is a random variable whose cumulative distribution function is continuous everywhere. There are no "gaps", which would correspond to numbers which have a finite probability of occurring.  Instead, continuous random variables almost never take an exact prescribed value c (formally) but there is a positive probability that its value will lie in particular intervals which can be arbitrarily small.  Continuous random variables usually admit probability density functions (PDF), which characterize their CDF and probability measures; 
such distributions are also called absolutely continuous; but some continuous distributions are singular, or mixes of an absolutely continuous part and a singular part.

An example of a continuous random variable would be one based on a spinner that can choose a horizontal direction. Then the values taken by the random variable are directions. We could represent these directions by North, West, East, South, Southeast, etc. However, it is commonly more convenient to map the sample space to a random variable which takes values which are real numbers. This can be done, for example, by mapping a direction to a bearing in degrees clockwise from North. The random variable then takes values which are real numbers from the interval [0, 360), with all parts of the range being "equally likely". In this case, X = the angle spun. Any real number has probability zero of being selected, but a positive probability can be assigned to any range of values. Instead of speaking of a probability mass function, we say that the probability density of X is 1/360. The probability of a subset of [0, 360) can be calculated by multiplying the measure of the set by 1/360. In general, the probability of a set for a given continuous random variable can be calculated by integrating the density over the given set.

More formally, given any interval , a random variable  is called a "continuous uniform random variable" (CURV) if the probability that it takes a value in a subinterval depends only on the length of the subinterval. This implies that the probability of  falling in any subinterval  is proportional to the length of the subinterval, that is, if , one has

where the last equality results from the unitarity axiom of probability. The probability density function of a CURV  is given by the indicator function of its interval of support normalized by the interval's length: Of particular interest is the uniform distribution on the unit interval . This exploits properties of cumulative distribution functions, which are a unifying framework for all random variables.

Mixed type

A mixed random variable is a random variable whose cumulative distribution function is neither discrete nor everywhere-continuous. It can be realized as a mixture of a discrete random variable and a continuous random variable; in which case the  will be the weighted average of the CDFs of the component variables.

An example of a random variable of mixed type would be based on an experiment where a coin is flipped and the spinner is spun only if the result of the coin toss is heads. If the result is tails, X = −1; otherwise X = the value of the spinner as in the preceding example. There is a probability of  that this random variable will have the value −1. Other ranges of values would have half the probabilities of the last example.

Most generally, every probability distribution on the real line is a mixture of discrete part, singular part, and an absolutely continuous part; see . The discrete part is concentrated on a countable set, but this set may be dense (like the set of all rational numbers).

Measure-theoretic definition

The most formal, axiomatic definition of a random variable involves measure theory. Continuous random variables are defined in terms of sets of numbers, along with functions that map such sets to probabilities. Because of various difficulties (e.g. the Banach–Tarski paradox) that arise if such sets are insufficiently constrained, it is necessary to introduce what is termed a sigma-algebra to constrain the possible sets over which probabilities can be defined. Normally, a particular such sigma-algebra is used, the Borel σ-algebra, which allows for probabilities to be defined over any sets that can be derived either directly from continuous intervals of numbers or by a finite or countably infinite number of unions and/or intersections of such intervals.

The measure-theoretic definition is as follows.

Let  be a probability space and  a measurable space. This definition enables us to measure any subset  in the target space by looking at its preimage, which by assumption is measurable.

The random variable is then a function from any outcome to a quantity, such that the outcomes leading to any useful subset of quantities for the random variable have a well-defined probability.

In such case the -valued random variable is called an -valued random variable. Moreover, when the space  is the real line , then such a real-valued random variable is called simply a random variable.

Real-valued random variables

In this case the observation space is the set of real numbers. Recall,   is the probability space. For a real observation space, the function  is a real-valued random variable if

This definition is a special case of the above because the set  generates the Borel σ-algebra on the set of real numbers, and it suffices to check measurability on any generating set. Here we can prove measurability on this generating set by using the fact that .

Moments

The probability distribution of a random variable is often characterised by a small number of parameters, which also have a practical interpretation. For example, it is often enough to know what its "average value" is. This is captured by the mathematical concept of expected value of a random variable, denoted , and also called the first moment.

Mathematically, this is known as the (generalised) problem of moments: for a given class of random variables , find a collection  of functions such that the expectation values  fully characterise the distribution of the random variable .

Moments can only be defined for real-valued functions of random variables (or complex-valued, etc.).  If the random variable is itself real-valued, then moments of the variable itself can be taken, which are equivalent to moments of the identity function  of the random variable.  However, even for non-real-valued random variables, moments can be taken of real-valued functions of those variables.  For example, for a categorical random variable X that can take on the nominal values "red", "blue" or "green", the real-valued function  can be constructed; this uses the Iverson bracket, and has the value 1 if  has the value "green", 0 otherwise.  Then, the expected value and other moments of this function can be determined.

Functions of random variables

A new random variable Y can be defined by applying a real Borel measurable function  to the outcomes of a real-valued random variable . That is, .

If function  is invertible (i.e.,  exists, where  is 's inverse function) and is either increasing or decreasing, then the previous relation can be extended to obtain

If there is no invertibility of  but each  admits at most a countable number of roots (i.e., a finite, or countably infinite, number of  such that ) then the previous relation between the probability density functions can be generalized with

where , according to the inverse function theorem. The formulas for densities do not demand  to be increasing.

(However, this is not necessarily true if  is Lebesgue measurable.)

Example 1

Let  be a real-valued, continuous random variable and let .

If , then , so

If , then

so

Example 2

Suppose  is a random variable with a cumulative distribution

where  is a fixed parameter. Consider the random variable  Then,

The last expression can be calculated in terms of the cumulative distribution of  so

which is the cumulative distribution function (CDF) of an exponential distribution.

Example 3

Suppose  is a random variable with a standard normal distribution, whose density is

Consider the random variable  We can find the density using the above formula for a change of variables:

However, because of symmetry, both halves will transform identically, i.e.,

The inverse transformation is

and its derivative is

Then,

This is a chi-squared distribution with one degree of freedom.

Example 4

Suppose  is a random variable with a normal distribution, whose density is

Consider the random variable  We can find the density using the above formula for a change of variables:

Differently from the previous example, in this case however, there is no symmetry and we have to compute the two distinct terms:

The inverse transformation is

and its derivative is

Then,

This is a noncentral chi-squared distribution with one degree of freedom.

Some properties
 The probability distribution of the sum of two independent random variables is the convolution of each of their distributions.
 Probability distributions are not a vector space—they are not closed under linear combinations, as these do not preserve non-negativity or total integral 1—but they are closed under convex combination, thus forming a convex subset of the space of functions (or measures).

Equivalence of random variables

There are several different senses in which random variables can be considered to be equivalent. Two random variables can be equal, equal almost surely, or equal in distribution.

In increasing order of strength, the precise definition of these notions of equivalence is given below.

Equality in distribution

If the sample space is a subset of the real line, random variables X and Y are equal in distribution (denoted ) if they have the same distribution functions:

To be equal in distribution, random variables need not be defined on the same probability space. Two random variables having equal moment generating functions have the same distribution. This provides, for example, a useful method of checking equality of certain functions of independent, identically distributed (IID) random variables. However, the moment generating function exists only for distributions that have a defined Laplace transform.

Almost sure equality

Two random variables X and Y are equal almost surely (denoted ) if, and only if, the probability that they are different is zero:

For all practical purposes in probability theory, this notion of equivalence is as strong as actual equality. It is associated to the following distance:

where "ess sup" represents the essential supremum in the sense of measure theory.

Equality

Finally, the two random variables X and Y are equal if they are equal as functions on their measurable space:

This notion is typically the least useful in probability theory because in practice and in theory, the underlying measure space of the experiment is rarely explicitly characterized or even characterizable.

Convergence

A significant theme in mathematical statistics consists of obtaining convergence results for certain sequences of random variables; for instance the law of large numbers and the central limit theorem.

There are various senses in which a sequence  of random variables can converge to a random variable . These are explained in the article on convergence of random variables.

See also

Aleatoricism
Algebra of random variables
Event (probability theory)
Multivariate random variable
Pairwise independent random variables
Observable variable
Random compact set
Random element
Random function
Random measure
Random number generator produces a random value 
Random variate
Random vector
Randomness
Stochastic process
Relationships among probability distributions

References

Inline citations

Literature

External links

 
 

Statistical randomness